Katamak (also Romanized as Katemak; also known as Katemag) is a village in Qorqori Rural District, Qorqori District, Hirmand County, Sistan and Baluchestan Province, Iran. At the 2006 census, its population was 308, in 66 families.

References 

Populated places in Hirmand County